The Eleusinian Mysteries Hydria is a 4th-century BC ancient Greek red-figure hydria, showing the reunion of Demeter and Persephone at the start of each spring. It was used for the celebration of the Eleusinian Mysteries, a secret cult of the two goddesses and of the rebirth of nature. It is painted in the Kertch style. It is now in the Museum of Fine Arts of Lyon.

Dating to between 375 BC and 350 BC, it was found with another large vase in a tomb in the Santa Maria necropolis in Capua in southern Italy, giving rise to the theory that it had been buried with a former pilgrim to Eleusis. It entered the collection of Alessandro Castellani before being sold from it in the Palazzo Castellani sale in Rome from 17 March to 10 April 1884. It was bought by Tyszkiewicz and then - when he sold his collection in Paris in 1898 - it was bought by its present owners.

Sources

Individual ancient Greek vases
Hydria
4th century BC in art
4th-century BC artefacts
Antiquities of the Museum of Fine Arts of Lyon